Myrmaeciella is a genus of fungi within the Niessliaceae family. The genus contains 2 species.

References

External links 

 Myrmaeciella at Index Fungorum

Sordariomycetes genera
Niessliaceae
Taxa named by Gustav Lindau